William Matthew Strannigan (December 1, 1918 – September 7, 1997) was an American college men's basketball coach . He was the head coach of Colorado State from 1950 to 1954, Iowa State from 1954 to 1959, and Wyoming from 1959 to 1973. He coached his teams to a 308-289 record, winning one Mountain States Conference championship, two Western Athletic Conference championships, two NCAA tournament appearances, and two NIT appearances.  He played his college basketball at Wyoming.  He was inducted into the Wyoming athletics Hall of Fame in 1994 and the Iowa State athletics Hall of Fame in 2005.

Head coaching record

References

1918 births
1997 deaths
Amateur Athletic Union men's basketball players
Colorado State Rams men's basketball coaches
High school basketball coaches in the United States
Iowa State Cyclones men's basketball coaches
Scottish basketball coaches
Wyoming Cowboys baseball players
Wyoming Cowboys basketball coaches
Wyoming Cowboys basketball players
Wyoming Cowboys football players